Anastas Ivanovich Mikoyan (25 November 1895 – 21 October 1978) was an Armenian Communist revolutionary, Old Bolshevik and Soviet statesman. He was the only Soviet politician who managed to remain at the highest levels of power within the Communist Party while that power oscillated between the Central Committee and the Politburo. His career extended from the days of Lenin, to the eras of Stalin and Khrushchev, to his peaceful retirement under Brezhnev.

An early convert to the Bolshevik cause, Mikoyan participated in the Baku Commune under the leadership of Stepan Shahumyan during the Russian Civil War in the Caucasus. In the 1920s, he served as the First Secretary of the North Caucasus region. During Stalin's rule, Mikoyan held several high governmental posts, including that of Minister of Foreign Trade. However, by the 1940s, Mikoyan began to lose favour with Stalin. In 1949, he lost his long-standing post of minister of foreign trade, and in October 1952, Stalin attacked him harshly at the 19th Party Congress. When Stalin died in 1953, Mikoyan again took a leading role in policy-making. Together, he and Khrushchev crafted the de-Stalinization policy and later he became First Deputy Premier under Khrushchev. Mikoyan's position during the Thaw made him the second most powerful figure in the Soviet Union at the time.

Mikoyan made several key trips to communist Cuba and to the United States, acquiring an important stature on the international diplomatic scene, especially with his skill in exercising soft power to further Soviet interests. In 1964 Khrushchev was forced to step down in a coup that brought Brezhnev to power. Mikoyan served as Chairman of the Presidium of the Supreme Soviet, the nominal Head of State, from 1964 until his forced retirement in 1965.

Early life and career

Mikoyan was born to Armenian parents in the village of Sanahin, then part of the Tiflis Governorate of the Russian Empire (today part of Alaverdi in Armenia's Lori Province) in 1895. His father, Hovhannes, was a carpenter and his mother, a rug weaver. He had one younger brother, Artem Mikoyan, who would be the co-founder of the MiG aviation design bureau, which became one of the primary design bureaus of fast jets in Soviet military aviation.

Mikoyan received his education at the Nersisian School in Tiflis and the Gevorgian Seminary in Vagharshapat (Echmiadzin), both affiliated with the Armenian Apostolic Church. Religion, however, played an increasingly insignificant role in his life. He would later remark that his continued studies in theology drew him closer to atheism: "I had a very clear feeling that I didn't believe in God and that I had in fact received a certificate in materialist uncertainty; the more I studied religious subjects, the less I believed in God." Before becoming active in politics Mikoyan had already dabbled in the study of liberalism and socialism.

At the age of twenty, he formed a workers' soviet in Echmiadzin. In 1915 Mikoyan formally joined the Bolshevik faction of the Russian Social Democratic Labour Party (later known as the Bolshevik Party) and became a leader of the revolutionary movement in the Caucasus. His interactions with Soviet revolutionaries led him to Baku, where he became the co-editor for the Armenian-language newspaper Sotsyal-Demokrat and later for the Russian-language paper Izvestia Bakinskogo Soveta. During this time, he is said to have robbed a bank in Tiflis with TNT and had his nose broken in street fighting.

Baku Commune

After the February 1917 revolution that toppled the Tsarist government, Mikoyan and other Bolsheviks fought against anti-Bolshevik elements in the Caucasus. Mikoyan became a commissar in the newly formed Red Army and continued to fight in Baku against anti-Bolshevik forces. He was wounded in the fighting and was noted for saving the life of fellow Party-member Sergo Ordzhonikidze. Afterwards, he continued his Party work, becoming one of the co-founders of the Baku Commune under the leadership of Stepan Shaumian. In Baku, he worked as the editor of the commune's official Armenian newspaper Teghekatu, and as the political commissar supervising its armed Armenian militia. He directed the seizure of the banks in April 1918, and the defence of Baku against the advancing Turkish army in July 1918.

After the fall of Baku, Shaumian and other Bolshevik leaders were arrested by the Centrocaspian Dictatorship. A commando unit, led by Mikoyan, organized their escape from prison, and they fled across the Caspian Sea to Krasnovodsk (today Türkmenbaşy in present-day Turkmenistan). However, at Krasnovodsk they were arrested by the Transcaspian Government, which was controlled by the British-allied Socialist Revolutionaries. The SR authorities executed the 26 Baku commissars, including Shaumian, on 20 September 1918 in the Turkmen desert. It was only by accident that Mikoyan avoided their fate. As American journalist Harrison Salisbury wrote:

After his release in February 1919, Mikoyan returned to Baku and resumed his activities there, helping to establish the Baku Bureau of the Caucasus Regional Committee (kraikom). In the middle of the Russian Civil War, the Central Committee assigned Mikoyan to the party organization in Nizhny Novgorod in 1920. In 1922-26, he became Secretary of the South East Bureau of the Communist Party and its successor, the North Caucasus kraikom. It was in that position that Mikoyan advocated granting Chechnya autonomous status. In 1923, he was elected to the Central Committee and remained a member of that body for more than 50 years.

Politburo member

Mikoyan supported Stalin, whom he had first met in 1919, in the power struggle that followed Lenin's death in 1924; During the 11th Congress of the CPSU, in 1922, before the power struggle between Stalin and Leon Trotsky had broken out into the open, Mikoyan characterised Trotsky as "a man of the state but not of the party". By saying that -according to Trotsky's biographer, Isaac Deutscher, "he summed up what many members of the Old Guard thought but did not yet utter in public."

As People's Commissar for External and Internal Trade from 1926, he imported ideas from the West, such as the manufacture of canned goods. In 1935 he was elected to the Politburo and was one of the first Soviet leaders to pay goodwill trips to the United States in order to boost economic cooperation. Mikoyan spent three months in the United States, where he not only learned more about its food industry but also met and spoke with Henry Ford and inspected Macy's in New York. When he returned, Mikoyan introduced a number of popular American consumer products to the Soviet Union, including American hamburgers, ice cream, corn flakes, popcorn, tomato juice, grapefruit and corn on the cob.

Mikoyan spearheaded a project to produce a home cookbook, which would encourage a return to the domestic kitchen. The result, The Book of Tasty and Healthy Food (Kniga o vkusnoi i zdorovoi pishche), was published in 1939, and the 1952 edition sold 2.5 million copies. Mikoyan helped initiate the production of ice cream in the USSR and kept the quality of ice cream under his own personal control until he was dismissed. Stalin made a joke about this, stating, "You, Anastas, care more about ice cream, than about communism." Mikoyan also contributed to the development of meat production in the USSR (particularly, the so-called Mikoyan cutlet), and one of the Soviet-era sausage factories was named after him.

The Great Purge
In the late 1930s Stalin embarked upon the Great Purge, a series of campaigns of political repression and persecution in the Soviet Union orchestrated against members of the Communist Party, as well as the peasantry and unaffiliated persons. In assessing Mikoyan's role in the purges, historian Simon Sebag-Montefiore states that he "enjoyed the reputation of one of the more decent leaders: he certainly helped the victims later and worked hard to undo Stalin's rule after the Leader's death." Mikoyan tried to save some close-knit companions from being executed. However, in 1936 he enthusiastically supported the execution of Grigory Zinoviev and Lev Kamenev, claiming it to be a "just verdict." As with other leading officials in 1937, Mikoyan signed death-lists given to him by the NKVD. The purges were often accomplished by officials close to Stalin, giving them the assignment largely as a way to test their loyalty to the regime.

In September 1937, Stalin dispatched Georgy Malenkov and Mikhail Litvin (1892-1938) of the NKVD to Yerevan, the capital of Soviet Armenia, in response to the death of Sahak Ter-Gabrielyan. Their mission was to oversee the purge of the Armenian Communist Party and its leaders First Secretary Amatuni Amatuni and NKVD chief Khachik Mughdusi, both Beria loyalists. Stalin later dispatched Mikoyan too, in order to test his loyalty and send a signal to Soviet Armenian leaders. Stalin did not trust Mikoyan due to his leniency towards the persecuted. In several instances, Mikoyan had intervened on behalf of his friends and colleagues to save them. During his trip to Armenia, he tried, but failed, to save one individual (Daniel "Danush" Shahverdyan) from being executed. However, on Stalin's orders, he led the attack during a stormy session of the Central Committee of the Armenian Communist Party in September 1937, during which Amatuni angrily called him a "liar." More than a thousand people were arrested and seven of nine members of the Armenian Politburo were sacked from office.

World War II
In September 1939, under the Molotov–Ribbentrop Pact, Nazi Germany and the Soviet Union each carved out their own spheres of influence in Poland and Eastern Europe. The Soviets arrested 26,000 Polish officers in the eastern portion of Poland and in March 1940, after some deliberation, Stalin and five other members of the Politburo, Mikoyan included, signed an order for their execution as "nationalists and counterrevolutionaries". When Germany invaded the Soviet Union in June 1941, Mikoyan was placed in charge of organizing the transportation of food and supplies. His son Vladimir, a pilot in the Red Air Force, died in combat when his plane was shot down over Stalingrad. Mikoyan's main assignment throughout the war was supplying the Red Army with materiel, food and other necessities.

Mikoyan is also credited for his significant role in the 1941 relocation of Soviet industry from the threatened western cities, such as Moscow and Leningrad, eastward to the Urals, Western Siberia, the Volga region, and other safer zones.

In February 1942, by order of Stalin, Mikoyan became a Special Representative of the State Defense Committee. He had not been a member until that point because Beria believed he would be of more use in government administration. Mikoyan was decorated with a Hero of Socialist Labor in 1943 for his efforts. In 1946, he became the Vice-Premier of the Council of Ministers. As Minister of Foreign Trade, he was responsible for the dismantlement of industry and infrastructure in Soviet-occupied Eastern Germany for collection as reparations.

Thaw and de-Stalinization

Shortly before his death in 1953, Stalin considered launching a new purge against Mikoyan, Vyacheslav Molotov, and several other Party leaders. Mikoyan and others gradually began to fall out of favor and, in one instance, were accused of plotting against Stalin. Stalin's plans never came to fruition, however, as he died before he could put them into motion. Mikoyan originally argued against punishing Stalin's right-hand man, Beria, but later gave in to popular support among Party members for his arrest. Mikoyan remained in the government after Stalin's death, in the post of Minister of Trade under Malenkov. He supported Nikita Khrushchev in the power struggle to succeed Stalin, and became First Deputy Premier in recognition of his services.

In 1956, Mikoyan helped Khrushchev organize the "Secret Speech", delivered by Khrushchev at the 20th Party Congress, which denounced Stalin's personality cult. It was he, and not Khrushchev, who made the first anti-Stalinist speech at the 20th Congress. Along with Khrushchev, he helped roll back some of the stifling restrictions on national cultures imposed during Stalin's time. In 1954, he visited his native Armenia and gave a speech in Yerevan, where he encouraged Armenians to republish the works of Raffi and the purged writer Yeghishe Charents. Behind the scenes, he assisted Soviet Armenian leaders in the rehabilitation of former "enemies" in the republic, and worked with Gulag returnees Alexei Snegov and Olga Shatunovskaya on the process of de-Stalinization.

In 1957, Mikoyan refused to back an attempt by Malenkov and Molotov to remove Khrushchev from power, and thus secured his position as one of Khrushchev's closest allies during the Thaw. He backed Khrushchev because of his strong support for de-Stalinization, and his belief that a triumph by the plotters might have given way to purges similar to those in the 1930s. In recognition of his support and his economic talents, Khrushchev appointed Mikoyan First Deputy Premier.

In 1962, Khrushchev sent Mikoyan and Frol Kozlov to Novocherkassk to deal with growing unrest in the southern city. Although Mikoyan opposed force and sought dialogue with the demonstrators, Kozlov pushed for a harsh response, resulting in the Novocherkassk massacre.

Foreign diplomacy

China 
Mikoyan was the first Politburo member to make direct contact with the Chinese Communist Party chairman, Mao Zedong. He arrived at Mao's headquarters on 30 January 1949, one day before the Nationalist government of Chiang Kai-shek was forced to abandon Nanjing, which was then China's capital, and move to Guangzhou. Mikoyan reported that Mao was proclaiming Stalin to be the supreme leader of world communism and 'teacher of the Chinese people', but in his report he added that Mao did not genuinely believe what he was saying. It was at Stalin's behest that Mikoyan asked that the Chinese communists arrest the US journalist Sidney Rittenberg.

Czechoslovakia 
On 11 November 1951, Mikoyan made a sudden visit to Prague to deliver a message from Stalin to President Klement Gottwald insisting that Rudolf Slánský, former Secretary-General of the Communist Party of Czechoslovakia, should be arrested. When Gottwald demurred, Mikoyan broke off the interview to ring Stalin, before repeating the demand, after which Gottwald capitulated. This was the biggest single step towards the preparation of the Slánský Trial. Mikoyan's role in the repression in Czechoslovakia was kept secret until the Prague Spring of 1968.

Hungary
In July 1956, Mikoyan visited the People's Republic of Hungary to oversee the removal of the dictator Mátyás Rákosi. He returned in October to gather information on the developing crisis caused by the revolution against the Hungarian Working People's Party government there. Together with Mikhail Suslov, Mikoyan traveled to Budapest in an armored personnel carrier, in view of the shooting in the streets. He sent a telegram to Moscow reporting his impressions of the situation. "We had the impression that Ernő Gerő especially, but the other comrades as well, are exaggerating the strength of the opponent and underestimating their own strength," he and Suslov wrote. Mikoyan strongly opposed the decision by Khrushchev and the Politburo to use Soviet troops, believing it would destroy the Soviet Union's international reputation, instead arguing for the application of "military intimidation" and economic pressure. The crushing of the revolution by Soviet forces nearly led to Mikoyan's resignation.

United States

Khrushchev's liberalization of hard-line policies led to an improvement in relations between the Soviet Union and the United States during the late 1950s. As Khrushchev's primary emissary, Mikoyan visited the United States several times. Despite the volatility of the Cold War between the two superpowers, many Americans received Mikoyan amiably, including Minnesota Democrat Hubert Humphrey, who characterized him as someone who showed a "flexibility of attitude" and New York governor Averell Harriman, who described him as a "less rigid" Soviet politician.

During November 1958 Khrushchev made an unsuccessful attempt to turn all of Berlin into an independent, demilitarized "free city", giving the United States, Great Britain, and France a six-month ultimatum to withdraw their troops from the sectors they still occupied in West Berlin, or he would transfer control of Western access rights to the East Germans. Mikoyan disapproved of Khrushchev's actions, claiming they violated "Party principle." Khrushchev had proposed the ultimatum to the West before discussing it with the Central Committee. Ruud van Djik, a historian, believed Mikoyan was angry because Khrushchev didn't consult him about the proposal. When asked by Khrushchev to ease tension with the United States, Mikoyan responded, "You started it, so you go!"

However, Mikoyan eventually left for Washington DC, which was the first time a senior governing member of the USSR's Council of Ministers visited the United States on a diplomatic mission to its leadership. Furthermore, Mikoyan approached the mission with unprecedented informality, beginning with phrasing his visa request to US Embassy as "a fortnight's holiday" to visit his friend, Mikhail Menshikov, the then Soviet Ambassador to the United States. While the White House was taken off guard by this seemingly impromptu diplomatic mission, Mikoyan was invited to speak to numerous elite American organizations such as the Council on Foreign Relations and the Detroit Club in which he professed his hopes for the USSR to have a more peaceful relationship with the US. While in Cleveland, Mikoyan gifted a troika to industrialist Cyrus Eaton and admired the city's Terminal Tower, which reminded him of the tower at Moscow State University.

In addition to such well received engagements, Mikoyan indulged in more informal opportunities to meet the public such as having breakfast at a Howard Johnson's restaurant on the New Jersey Turnpike, visiting Macy's Department Store in New York City and meeting celebrities in Hollywood like Jerry Lewis and Sophia Loren before having an audience with President Dwight Eisenhower and Secretary of State John Foster Dulles. Although Mikoyan failed to alter the US's Berlin policy, he was hailed in the US for easing international tensions with an innovative emphasis on soft diplomacy that largely went over well with the American public.

Mikoyan disapproved of Khrushchev's walkout from the 1960 Paris Summit over the U-2 Crisis of 1960, which he believed kept tension in the Cold War high for another fifteen years. However, throughout this time, he remained Khrushchev's closest ally in the upper echelons of the Soviet leadership. As Mikoyan later noted, Khrushchev "engaged [in] inexcusable hysterics".

In November 1963 Mikoyan was asked by Khrushchev to represent the USSR at President John F. Kennedy's funeral. At the funeral ceremony, Mikoyan appeared visibly shaken by the president's death and was approached by Jacqueline Kennedy, who took his hand and conveyed to him the following message: "Please tell Mr. Chairman [Khrushchev] that I know he and my husband worked together for a peaceful world, and now he and you must carry on my husband's work."

Cuba and the Missile Crisis

The Soviet government welcomed the overthrow of Cuban President Fulgencio Batista by Fidel Castro's pro-socialist rebels in the Cuban Revolution of 1959. Khrushchev realized the potential of a Soviet ally in the Caribbean and dispatched Mikoyan as one of the top diplomats in Latin America. He was the first Soviet official to visit Cuba after the revolution, except for Soviet intelligence officers, and he secured important trade agreements with the new government. He left Cuba with a very positive impression, saying that the atmosphere there made him feel "as though I had returned to my childhood."

Khrushchev told Mikoyan of his idea of shipping Soviet missiles to Cuba. Mikoyan was opposed to the idea, and was even more opposed to giving the Cubans control over the Soviet missiles. In early November 1962, after the United States and the Soviet Union agreed to a framework to remove Soviet nuclear missiles from Cuba, Khrushchev dispatched Mikoyan to Havana to help persuade Castro to cooperate in the withdrawal. Just prior to beginning negotiations with Castro, Mikoyan was informed about the death of his wife, Ashkhen, in Moscow; rather than return there for the funeral, Mikoyan opted to stay and sent his son Sergo there instead.

Castro was adamant that the missiles remain but Mikoyan, seeking to avoid a full-fledged confrontation with the United States, attempted to convince him otherwise. He told Castro, "You know that not only in these letters but today also, we hold to the position that you will keep all the weapons and all the military specialists with the exception of the 'offensive' weapons and associated service personnel, which were promised to be withdrawn in Khrushchev's letter [of October 27]." Castro balked at the idea of further concessions, namely the removal of the Il-28 bombers and tactical nuclear weapons still left in Cuba. But after several tense and grueling weeks of negotiations, he finally relented and the missiles and the bombers were removed in December of that year.

Head of state and retirement
On 15 July 1964, Mikoyan was appointed as Chairman of the Presidium of the Supreme Soviet, replacing Leonid Brezhnev, who received a promotion within the Party. Mikoyan's new position was largely ceremonial; it was noted that his declining health and old age were being considered.

Some historians are convinced that by 1964 Mikoyan believed that Khrushchev had turned into a liability to the Party, and that he was involved in the October 1964 coup that brought Brezhnev and Alexei Kosygin to power. However, William Taubman disputes this, as Mikoyan was the only member of the Presidium (the name for the Politburo at this time) to defend Khrushchev. Mikoyan, however, did vote to force Khrushchev's retirement (so as, in traditional Soviet style, to make the vote unanimous). Alone among Khrushchev's colleagues, Mikoyan wished the former leader well in his retirement, and he, alone, visited Khrushchev at his dacha a few years later. Mikoyan laid a wreath and sent a letter of condolence at Khrushchev's funeral in 1971.

Due to his partial defense of Khrushchev during his ouster, Mikoyan lost his high standing with the new Soviet leadership. The Politburo forced Mikoyan to retire from his seat in the Politburo due to old age. Mikoyan quickly also lost his post as head of state and was succeeded in this post by Nikolai Podgorny on 9 December 1965. In retirement, Mikoyan, like Khrushchev, wrote frank but selective memoirs from his political career, including his revolutionary activity in Baku. He died on 21 October 1978, at the age of 82, from natural causes and was buried at Novodevichy Cemetery in Moscow. He received six commendations of the Order of Lenin.

Personality and legacy

Simon Sebag-Montefiore referred to Mikoyan as "slim, circumspect, wily and industrious". An intelligent man, he had the command of several languages. In addition to Armenian and Russian, he understood English and learned German on his own by translating the German version of Karl Marx's Das Kapital into Russian. Unlike many others, Mikoyan was not afraid to get into heated arguments with Stalin. "One was never bored with Mikoyan", Artyom Sergeev notes, while Khrushchev called him a true cavalier. However, Khrushchev warned of trusting "that shrewd fox from the east." In a close conversation with Vyacheslav Molotov and Nikolai Bukharin, Stalin referred to Mikoyan as a "duckling in politics"; he noted, however, that if Mikoyan ever took a serious shot he would improve. Mikoyan had five boys (Stepan, Vladimir, Aleksei, Vano, and Sergo), and adopted the two sons of the late Bolshevik leader Stepan Shahumyan. He had so many children under his care that he and his wife faced financial problems. His wife Ashkhen would borrow money from Politburo wives who had fewer children. If Mikoyan had discovered this, he would, according to his children, have become furious.

Mikoyan was defiantly proud of his Armenian identity, and in a 1959 meeting with U.S. Vice President Richard Nixon in Washington, he even raised the issue of the treatment of the Armenians in Turkey. He greatly enjoyed meeting fellow Armenians abroad, including former U.S. ambassador Edward Djerejian. However, in post-Soviet Armenia, Mikoyan's legacy is contentious. His critics point to his participation in the 1930s purges in Armenia on the orders of Stalin. His supporters argue that he was a major figure on the global political stage and usually point to his role in defusing the Cuban missile crisis. Others emphasize Mikoyan's important role in de-Stalinization in Armenia, including his March 1954 speech in Yerevan and his significant involvement in rehabilitations. Mikoyan's contributions to the development of the Soviet Armenian state included support for major economic projects, such as the Arpa–Sevan canal. As a Supreme Soviet Deputy for Yerevan, he maintained close ties with Soviet Armenian leaders like Yakov Zarobyan and Anton Kochinyan and regularly consulted with them on Armenian affairs. Although limited in his ability to assist Armenian leaders on Nagorno-Karabakh, he was sympathetic to Armenian concerns, and his son Sergo was later a prominent advocate for the Karabakh movement. Despite his break with the Armenian Church, Mikoyan maintained good relations with Catholicos Vazgen I. He was also a supporter of composer Aram Khachaturian, and counted Marshal Ivan Bagramyan among his personal friends.

Dubbed the Vicar of Bray of politics and known as the "Survivor" during his time, Mikoyan was one of the few Old Bolsheviks who was spared from Stalin's purges and was able to retire comfortably from political life. This was highlighted in a number of popular sayings in Russian, including "From Ilyich [Lenin] to Ilyich [Brezhnev] ... without heart attack or stroke!"(Ot Ilyicha do Ilyicha bez infarkta i paralicha). One veteran Soviet official described his political career in the following manner: "The rascal was able to walk through Red Square on a rainy day without an umbrella [and] without getting wet. He could dodge the raindrops."

Portrayals

Paul Whitehouse played Mikoyan in the 2017 satirical film The Death of Stalin.

Decorations and awards
 Hero of Socialist Labour
 Order of Lenin, six times
 Order of the October Revolution
 Order of the Red Banner

References

Further reading

External links
 Mikoyan Brothers Museum, Sanahin, Alaverdi, Armenia
 

1895 births
1978 deaths
People from Lori Province
People from Tiflis Governorate
Armenian atheists
Armenian former Christians
Burials at Novodevichy Cemetery
Communist Party of the Soviet Union members
People's commissars and ministers of the Soviet Union
Great Purge perpetrators
Heads of state of the Soviet Union
Heroes of Socialist Labour
Recipients of the Order of Lenin
Recipients of the Order of the Red Banner
Old Bolsheviks
Party leaders of the Soviet Union
Russian Social Democratic Labour Party members
Russian people of Armenian descent
Russian revolutionaries
Soviet politicians
Soviet diplomats
Politburo of the Central Committee of the Communist Party of the Soviet Union members
Communist Party of Armenia (Soviet Union) politicians
Nersisian School alumni
Armenian revolutionaries
Soviet Armenians
Armenian people from the Russian Empire
Ethnic Armenian politicians
Mikoyan family